The following is a list of schools in Tamworth.

Government schools

Non-government schools

References

Tamworth
Schools